Lázaro Luan Scapolan (born 30 December 1988) is a Portuguese professional footballer who plays as a defensive midfielder for Paraná Clube.

In the summer of 2012, Luan signed for Portuguese club Gil Vicente. After making no league appearances in the first half of the 2012–13 season, Luan went on loan with former club Audax São Paulo.

References

External links
 
 

1988 births
Living people
Footballers from São Paulo
Brazilian footballers
Association football midfielders
Campeonato Brasileiro Série B players
Campeonato Brasileiro Série C players
Campeonato Brasileiro Série D players
São Paulo FC players
Esporte Clube Santo André players
Grêmio Osasco Audax Esporte Clube players
Red Bull Brasil players
Sport Club Corinthians Alagoano players
Esporte Clube Juventude players
Avaí FC players
Paraná Clube players
Primeira Liga players
Gil Vicente F.C. players
Süper Lig players
Akhisarspor footballers
Brazilian expatriate footballers
Brazilian expatriate sportspeople in Portugal
Brazilian expatriate sportspeople in Turkey
Expatriate footballers in Portugal
Expatriate footballers in Turkey